Anna is a women's magazine based in Helsinki, Finland. Founded in 1963 it is one of the earliest women magazines in the country.

History and profile
Anna was launched in 1963. The cover of the first issue which was published in August 1963 featured Johanna Toivonen, a Finnish fashion model and stewardess. The magazine is part of Otava Media and published on a weekly basis. Its target audience is middle-class women.

The magazine encourages the emancipation of women, and in the 1980s described itself as a feminist magazine. However, in 2013 a female journalist of the magazine was fired due to her negative writings about L'Oreal which was a major advertiser for the magazine. During this incident the editor-in-chief of the magazine was Emma Koivula who urged her to resign from the post.

Anna focuses on the profiles of Finnish female politicians and also covers the international career path of Finnish fashion models. Uma Aaltonen is one of the contributors of the magazine. In 2003 Anna sold 502,000 copies. As of 2008 the magazine had more than 100,000 readers.

References

External links

1963 establishments in Finland
Feminism in Finland
Feminist magazines
Finnish-language magazines
Magazines established in 1963
Magazines published in Helsinki
Weekly magazines published in Finland
Women's magazines published in Finland